Prince of Wales was launched in 1793 on the Thames. She spent much of her career sailing for the Hudson's Bay Company (HBC). From 1845 she was a Greenland whaler, sailing out of Hull. In 1845 she was the last ship to see Sir John Franklin's expedition to the arctic. She was wrecked on 12 June 1849 in Davis Strait.

Hudson's Bay Company
Prince of Wales had been launched in 1793 for the HBC, and first appeared in Lloyd's Register (LR) with H.Hanwell, master, Hudson's Bay Company, owner, and trade London–Hudson Bay. War with France had just begun and Captain Henry Hanwell acquired a letter of marque on 8 April 1793. Hanwell sailed for Hudson Bay at the end of May, sailing via Stromness. She then sailed between York Factory or Moose Factory and London.

In 1811 Prince of Wales, and Edward and Ann carried immigrants to Hudson Bay.

On 1 June 1813 three merchant vessels sailed from Gravesend, bound for Hudson Bay: Prince of Wales, Ramsay, master, carried employees of the Hudson's Bay Company, and Ann, Neale, master, was taking a party of Moravian missionaries. On 13 June they sailed from Stromness in the Orkney Islands. There Prince of Wales had embarked 97 settlers for the Red River Colony.  sailed as their escort. On the way fever broke out on Prince of Wales, which resulted in the death of a number of the emigrants. Instead of landing at York Factory, the convoy arrived at Churchill, Manitoba, 100 miles away. They arrived on 19 August, and Brazen left again on 20 September, escorting another convoy to England via the Orkney Islands and arriving at the Downs on 25 November. 

In 1816–1817, Prince of Wales overwintered at Charlton Island.

In 1819 Prince of Wales again carried settlers.

On 24 June 1826 as Prince of Wales was sailing out of Hoy Sound, bound for Hudson Bay, she struck a rock and was stuck there for four hours. She took on so much water she had to return and unload to effect repairs. On 1 July she put into Kirkcaldy for the repairs. On 10 July she resumed her voyage to Hudson Bay, repairs having been made. She arrived at Hudson Bay on 17 September.

Prince of Wales again overwintered at Charlton Island in 1830–1831. Some of the crew joined Beaver on an expedition to the Ungava Peninsula.

Prince of Wales overwintered at Charlton Island for a third time in 1833–1834.

Disposal: On 23 February 1842 the HBC ordered that Prince of Wales be advertised for sale. She then sold in 1844 to John Chambers, of Kingston upon Hull.

Northern whaler
Prince of Wales then became a Norther Whale Fishery whaler.

Prince of Wales, Captain Dannet, master, was the last to see Sir John Franklin's expedition to the Arctic.

Fate
On 12 June 1849 Prince of Wales sank in Davis Strait after ice crushed her. Her crew took to her boats, survived, and eventually reached the Orkney Islands.

Notes, citations, and references
Notes

Citations

References
 

1793 ships
Age of Sail merchant ships of England
Hudson's Bay Company ships
Migrant ships to Canada
Whaling ships
Maritime incidents in June 1849